Shahidabad Rural District is a rural district (dehestan) in Mashhad-e Morghab District, Khorrambid County, Fars Province, Iran. At the 2006 census, its population was 3,578, in 875 families.  The rural district has 20 villages.

References 

Rural Districts of Fars Province
Khorrambid County